The Japan Society of the United Kingdom, founded in 1891, is an organisation that fosters British-Japanese relations. It is the oldest such organisation dedicated to inter-cultural understanding and positive relationships between a European Country and Japan. The society is also known as the Japan Society of London, or simply as The Japan Society.

History

The society grew out of a meeting of the International Congress of Orientalists, held in London on 9 September 1891, when a resolution was passed calling for the formation of a society "for the encouragement of Japanese studies and for the purpose of bringing together all those in the United Kingdom and throughout the world who are interested in Japanese matters".

The society's founder, Arthur Diosy (1856-1923), was a debonair figure, who spoke fluent Japanese, and wrote several books including The New Far East'.

Membership

The society reports that it has a membership in excess of 1,000 individual and corporate members, 45% of which are Japanese.

Merger

In October 2007, the UK charity Japan 21, merged into the society, which adopted its educational and grassroots activities relating to Japan, alongside the society's business-related, academic and cultural activities.

Publications

From 1957 to 1985, the society published:
 

From 1892 to 1941, the society published:

See also
 Japan–United Kingdom relations
 Japan Society North West
 Hugh Cortazzi
 The Japan–British Society
 Joseph Henry Longford - Vice-President in 1922
 Walter Weston

References

External links
Japan Society

Japan–United Kingdom relations
S
1891 establishments in the United Kingdom
Organizations established in 1891
Cultural organizations based in Japan
Diaspora organisations in the United Kingdom